Take Hart  is a British children's television programme about art, presented by Tony Hart. It took over from Vision On, and ran from 1977 until 1983. The programme featured Hart and the animated Plasticine character Morph, and other characters created by David Sproxton like 'Smoulder the Moulder', which was a lump of mould which would create props by 'spraying' them out of a spray can. The only other human to appear on a regular basis was Mr Bennett, the caretaker, played by Colin Bennett. The programme won a BAFTA award for Hart in 1984.

As well as demonstrating small-scale projects (the type that viewers might be able to do), Hart also created large-scale artworks on the TV studio floor, and even used beaches and other open spaces as 'canvases' (to be viewed from a camera-crane). This idea was later adopted by Art Attack, which began in 1990.

A regular feature of the programme was 'The Gallery', which displayed artworks sent in by young viewers. The easy-listening vibraphone music accompanying this feature – "Left Bank Two", composed by Wayne Hill – has passed into British TV musical lore. In later series, "Left Bank Two" alternated with John Williams' recording of "Cavatina", and in the final three series, the theme music was replaced by the more reggae-like "Passion Punch", composed by Stanley Myers, and The Gallery music was replaced by "Marguerite", by Bob Morgan, which is also well-remembered by many viewers.

By the end of the eighth series in December 1983, Hart felt that the format of the programme, which essentially continued with much of the format of its predecessor Vision On, had become somewhat outdated and routine. Despite the award of a BAFTA in early 1984, viewing figures for Take Hart by 1983 had gradually fallen since the series' heyday in the late 1970s. In an attempt to update the image of the series, Take Hart  was dropped in December 1983, and replaced by the relatively more popular series Hartbeat.

Some 2 inch Quadruplex videotape master copies of Take Hart episodes were irretrievably junked by Adam Lee of the BBC archives in 1993 on the assumption that they were 'no use' and that examples of some other episodes were sufficient. A few months later, access to the material was requested by the head of Children's BBC's light entertainment department for a documentary on Tony Hart.

Series guide
Series 1: 13 editions first shown 15 February 1977 – 17 May 1977
Series 2: 6 editions first shown 14 March 1978 – 18 April 1978
Series 3: 13 editions first shown 3 January 1979 – 28 March 1979
Series 4: 13 editions first shown 2 January 1980 – 26 March 1980
Series 5: 15 editions first shown 14 January 1981 – 22 April 1981
Special:  Take Hart on Holiday By the Sea, first shown 12 June 1981
Series 6: 15 editions first shown 6 January 1982 – 14 April 1982
Series 7  15 editions first shown 5 January 1983 – 13 April 1983
Series 8: 10 editions first shown 28 October 1983 – 30 December 1983

References

External links

BBC children's television shows
British television series with live action and animation
1977 British television series debuts
1983 British television series endings
1970s British children's television series
1980s British children's television series
English-language television shows
Television series about art
Lost BBC episodes